Old Roanoke County Courthouse is a historic courthouse building located at Salem, Virginia. It was built in 1909-1910 and is a three-story, Classical Revival-style, yellow brick building.  The front facade features a three-story, tetra-style Ionic order portico. The courthouse has a hipped roof topped by a cupola, which is topped by an eagle. A rear addition was built in 1948–1949.  Also on the property is the contributing 1910 Civil War Memorial, that consists of a granite shaft topped by the figure of a Confederate soldier.  The building housed Roanoke County, Virginia county offices until they moved to a new building in 1985.

The building was added to the National Register of Historic Places in 1987. It is located in the Downtown Salem Historic District.  Today the property is owned by Roanoke College.

References

Courthouses on the National Register of Historic Places in Virginia
Neoclassical architecture in Virginia
Government buildings completed in 1910
Buildings and structures in Salem, Virginia
National Register of Historic Places in Salem, Virginia
Roanoke College
Individually listed contributing properties to historic districts on the National Register in Virginia